Mame Ousmane Cissokho (born 14 January 1987) is a Senegalese professional footballerwho most recently played as a left winger for French club AS Nancy.

External links
 
 

1987 births
Living people
Sportspeople from Saint-Louis, Senegal
Association football wingers
Senegalese footballers
AJ Auxerre players
Apollon Limassol FC players
FC Rouen players
Nîmes Olympique players
US Orléans players
AS Nancy Lorraine players
Ligue 1 players
Ligue 2 players
Championnat National players
Championnat National 3 players
Cypriot First Division players
Senegalese expatriate footballers
Senegalese expatriate sportspeople in Cyprus
Expatriate footballers in Cyprus